Frank Jaeger may refer to:

 Frank Jæger (1926–1977), Danish writer
 Frank Jaeger, the civilian name of the character Gray Fox in the Metal Gear video game series